Ejiro "E. J." Megetaveh Kuale [kuh-WAL-ee] (born June 22, 1983) is a former professional American and Canadian football linebacker. He was signed by the New Orleans Saints as an undrafted free agent in 2006. He played college football for the LSU Tigers.

Kuale was also a member of the Kansas City Chiefs, Calgary Stampeders, Toronto Argonauts, Montreal Alouettes, Saskatchewan Roughriders and Winnipeg Blue Bombers.

Early years
Kuale was born in Daytona Beach, Florida. During his high school career he was a First-team selection to the 5A all-state team, all-Southeast, and helped lead Mainland High School in Daytona Beach to a District 4-5A title. As a senior, he had 120 tackles, 9.5 sacks, seven quarterback hurries and seven forced fumbles.

College career

Georgia Tech
As a freshman in 2001 with Georgia Tech, Kuale played mainly on special teams. He was credited with special teams tackles against Clemson, Maryland and NC State. After the season Kuale decided to transfer to Dodge City Community College and sat out the 2002 season.

Dodge Community College
Kuale led the Kansas Jayhawk Community College Conference in tackles with 124 and three sacks. He was named Third-team All-Junior College and All-Conference.

Louisiana State

2004
Kuale transferred to Louisiana State and started two games for the Tigers. He started the season as the starter at strong side linebacker. He totaled 22 tackles, four tackles for a loss and two sacks. Against Ole Miss he totaled five tackles.

2005
After missing the first six games in the season with a broken ankle, Kuale debuted against North Texas on October 29. In the first few games after his return he played sparingly before playing most of the game against Arkansas. In the Arkansas game he recorded five tackles and then had another five tackles and a sack against Georgia in the SEC Championship Game. Against Miami in the Chick-fil-A Bowl he had one sack.

Professional career

National Football League
In May 2006 after going undrafted in the 2006 NFL Draft, Kuale signed with the New Orleans Saints. He was released before being re-signed before the 2007 season. In May 2008, Kuale signed with the Kansas City Chiefs.Unfortunately he was never able to make it on the field to play a down in the NFL.

Canadian Football League
Kuale signed with the Calgary Stampeders on May 7, 2009. He was released on June 25, 2009.

On February 22, 2010, Kuale signed with the Toronto Argonauts. For the 2010 CFL season, he ranked 3rd on the team in special teams tackles. In the playoffs, he was also employed as a part-time fullback and recorded one catch for 12 yards in Toronto's semi-final victory over the Hamilton Tiger-cats. Kuale played the 2011 and 2012 CFL seasons as a linebacker. In those two years he totaled 91 tackles. Kuale won the 100th Grey Cup at the close of the 2012 CFL season. On December 4, 2012 The Toronto Argonauts released Kuale.

Kuale signed with the Montreal Alouettes on February 25, 2013. Kuale played in only four games with the Alouettes before being released on August 10, 2013. In those four games he recorded four tackles and one special teams tackle.

Kuale signed with the Saskatchewan Roughriders to a practice roster deal on September 18, 2013. He was released on April 29, 2014.

References

External links
Winnipeg Blue Bombers bio

1983 births
Living people
Sportspeople from Daytona Beach, Florida
Players of American football from Florida
American football linebackers
Canadian football defensive linemen
American players of Canadian football
Georgia Tech Yellow Jackets football players
LSU Tigers football players
New Orleans Saints players
Kansas City Chiefs players
Calgary Stampeders players
Toronto Argonauts players
Saskatchewan Roughriders players
Dodge City Conquistadors football players
Winnipeg Blue Bombers players